Châtres may refer to:

 Châtres, Aube, a commune of the Aube département, France
 Châtres, Dordogne, a commune of the Dordogne département, France
 Châtres, Seine-et-Marne, a commune of the Seine-et-Marne département, France
 Châtres-la-Forêt, a commune of the Mayenne département, France
 Châtres-sur-Cher, a commune of the Loir-et-Cher département, France

See also
Chartres, a commune and capital of the Eure-et-Loir department, France